Najac is a railway station in Najac, Occitanie, France, on the Brive–Toulouse (via Capdenac) line. It is served by TER (local) services operated by SNCF.

Train services
These services currently call at Najac:
Local service (TER Occitanie) Toulouse–Figeac–Aurillac

References

Railway stations in Aveyron